127 Hours is a 2010 biographical survival drama film co-written, produced and directed by Danny Boyle. The film stars James Franco, Kate Mara, Amber Tamblyn and Clémence Poésy. In the film, canyoneer Aron Ralston must find a way to escape after he gets trapped by a boulder in an isolated slot canyon in Bluejohn Canyon, southeastern Utah, in April 2003. It is a British and American venture produced by Pathé, Everest Entertainment, Film4 Productions, HandMade Films and Cloud Eight Films.

The film, based on Ralston's memoir Between a Rock and a Hard Place (2004), was written by Boyle and Simon Beaufoy, co-produced by Christian Colson and John Smithson, and scored by A. R. Rahman. Beaufoy, Colson, and Rahman had all previously worked with Boyle on Slumdog Millionaire (2008). 127 Hours was well received by critics and audiences and grossed $60 million worldwide. It was nominated for six Academy Awards, including Best Actor for Franco and Best Picture.

The film's title refers to the period of non-stop activity from when Ralston was stranded in Blue John Canyon once his arm was trapped underneath a boulder, to when he was rescued and resuscitated.

Plot
In April 2003, avid mountaineer Aron Ralston goes hiking at Utah's Canyonlands National Park without telling anyone. He befriends hikers Kristi and Megan and shows them an underground pool before they head home. After that, Aron continues through a slot canyon in Bluejohn Canyon. While climbing, an 800 lb (362kg) boulder he was hanging off comes loose and causes both to fall, which traps his right arm against the wall. Aron attempts to move the boulder, but it will not budge; he also soon realizes he is alone. He shortly begins recording a video diary using his camcorder to maintain morale as he chips away parts of the boulder with a pocket knife. Over the next five days, Aron rations his food and remaining 300ml of water, struggles to keep warm at night, and is forced to drink his urine when his water runs out. He also sets up a pulley using his climbing rope in a futile attempt to lift the boulder.

Throughout the days, Aron becomes desperate and depressed and begins hallucinating about escape, relationships, and past experiences, including his family and his former girlfriend, Rana. During one hallucination, Aron realizes his mistake was that he did not tell anyone where he was going or for how long. Aron has a vision of his future son on the sixth day, spurring his will to survive. He fashions a tourniquet from CamelBak tube insulation and uses a carabiner to tighten it. Then, using his knowledge of torque, he breaks the bones in his arm and, using the multi-tool, slowly amputates it. Aron then wraps the stump to prevent exsanguination and takes a picture of the boulder before rappelling down a  rockface. He then finds some rainwater collected while descending down, drinks the stagnant water due to dehydration, and continues. He spots a family on a hike in the desert and calls for help. They give him water and alert the authorities; a Utah Highway Patrol helicopter brings him to a hospital.

A textual epilogue reveals that years later, Aron got married and had a son. He also continues climbing and always leaves a note telling his family where he has gone.

Cast 

 James Franco as Aron Ralston
 Kate Mara as Kristi Moore
 Amber Tamblyn as Megan McBride
 Clémence Poésy as Rana, Aron's lover
 Lizzy Caplan as Sonja Ralston, Aron's younger sister
 Kate Burton as Donna Ralston, Aron's mother
 Treat Williams as Larry Ralston, Aron's father

Ralston himself, his wife, and his son make cameo appearances at the end of the film.

Authenticity
The scenes early in the film of Ralston's encounter with the two hikers were altered to portray Ralston showing them a hidden pool, when in reality he just showed them some basic climbing moves. Despite these changes, with which he was initially uncomfortable, Ralston says the rest of the film is "so factually accurate it is as close to a documentary as you can get and still be a drama."

Other changes from the book include omissions of descriptions of Ralston's efforts after freeing himself: his bike was chained to itself, not to the tree as depicted at the beginning of the movie; he had to decide where to seek the fastest medical attention; he took a photo of himself at the small brown pool from which he really did drink; he had his first bowel movement of the week; he abandoned many of the items he had kept throughout his confinement; he got lost in a side canyon; and he met a family from the Netherlands (not an American family), Eric, Monique, and Andy Meijer, who already knew that he was probably lost in the area, thanks to the searches of his parents and the authorities. (The actor who plays Eric Meijer, Pieter Jan Brugge, is Dutch.)

Franco is never shown uttering even an "Ow"; Ralston wrote that this is accurate. Ralston did send Monique and Andy to run ahead to get help, and Ralston did walk seven miles before the helicopter came, although this trek is shown in the film's alternative ending.

Production
Danny Boyle had been wanting to make a film about Ralston's ordeal for four years; he wrote a film treatment and Simon Beaufoy wrote the screenplay. Boyle describes 127 Hours as "an action movie with a guy who can't move." He also expressed an interest for a more intimate film than his previous film, Slumdog Millionaire (2008): "I remember thinking, I must do a film where I follow an actor the way Darren Aronofsky did with The Wrestler. So 127 Hours is my version of that."

Boyle and Fox Searchlight announced plans to create 127 Hours in November 2009. Cillian Murphy was reportedly approached by Boyle to play Ralston. In January 2010, James Franco was cast as Ralston. In March 2010, filming began in Utah; Boyle intended to shoot the first part of the film with no dialogue. By 17 June 2010, the film was in post-production.

Boyle made the very unusual move of hiring two cinematographers to work first unit, Anthony Dod Mantle and Enrique Chediak, each of whom shot 50 percent of the film by trading off with each other. This allowed Boyle and Franco to work long days without wearing out the crew.

Boyle enlisted makeup effects designer Tony Gardner and his effects company, Alterian, Inc., to re-create the character's amputation of his own arm. Boyle stressed that the realism of the arm as well as the process itself were key to the audience's investing in the character's experience, and that the makeup effects' success would impact the film's success. The false arm rigs were created in layers, from fiberglass and steel bone, through silicone and fibrous muscle and tendon, to functional veins and arteries, and finally skinned with a translucent silicone layer of skin with a thin layer of subcutaneous silicone fat. Gardner states that the effects work was extremely stressful, as he wanted to do justice to the story; he credits James Franco equally with the success of the effects work. Three prosthetics were used in all, with two designed to show the innards of the arm and another to emulate the outside of it. Franco would later note that seeing blood on the arm was difficult for him and his reactions in those scenes were genuine.

Franco admitted that shooting the film was physically hard on him: "There was a lot of physical pain, and Danny knew that it was going to cause a lot of pain. And I asked him after we did the movie, 'How did you know how far you could push it?' ... I had plenty of scars...Not only am I feeling physical pain, but I'm getting exhausted. It became less of a façade I put on and more of an experience that I went through."

Soundtrack

Release
127 Hours was screened at the Toronto International Film Festival on 12 September 2010, following its premiere at the 2010 Telluride Film Festival. The film was selected to close the 2010 London Film Festival on 28 October 2010. It was given a limited release in the United States by Fox Searchlight Pictures on 5 November 2010. It was released in the United Kingdom by Pathé's then-theatrical distributor Warner Bros. Entertainment UK on 7 January 2011, which will be the last Pathé film to be released by Warner Bros. before returning to distributing Pathé films including Parallel Mothers and The Duke and in India on 26 January 2011.

There were many published reports (not all confirmed) that the trailer and film made audience members ill. The Huffington Post, in November 2010, wrote that it "has gotten audiences fainting, vomiting and worse in numbers unseen since The Exorcist – and the movie has not even hit theaters yet." 
During the screenings at Telluride Film Festival, two people required medical attention. At the first screening, an audience member became lightheaded and was taken out of the screening on a gurney. During a subsequent screening, another viewer suffered a panic attack. Similar reactions were reported at the Toronto International Film Festival and a special screening hosted by Pixar and Lee Unkrich, director of Toy Story 3 (2010) and Coco (2017). The website Movieline published "Armed and Dangerous: A Comprehensive Timeline of Everyone Who's Fainted (Or Worse) at 127 Hours."

Home media
20th Century Fox Home Entertainment released 127 Hours on DVD and Blu-ray on March 1, 2011 in the United States and on June 6, 2011 in the United Kingdom under the Pathé label.

Critical response
On review aggregation website Rotten Tomatoes, the film has an approval rating of 93% based on 238 critic reviews, with an average rating of 8.30/10. The site's critical consensus reads, "As gut-wrenching as it is inspirational, 127 Hours unites one of Danny Boyle's most beautifully exuberant directorial efforts with a terrific performance from James Franco." On Metacritic, which assigns a weighted average rating to reviews, the film has an average score of 82 out of 100, based on 38 critic reviews, indicating "universal acclaim".

Writing for DVD Talk, Casey Burchby concluded that "127 Hours will stay with you not necessarily as a story of survival, but as a story of a harrowing interior experience". Richard Roeper of The Chicago Sun-Times gave the film four stars, said he believed Franco deserved an Oscar nomination for his performance, and called the film "one of the best of the decade." Roger Ebert also awarded the film four stars out of four and wrote that "127 Hours is like an exercise in conquering the unfilmable". Gazelle Emami wrote for The Huffington Post, describing Franco's performance as "mesmerizing" and "incredible."

Accolades

127 Hours was nominated for three Golden Globe Awards, including Best Actor, Best Screenplay and Best Original Score.

The film was nominated for nine British Academy Film Awards, including Outstanding British Film, Best Direction, Best Actor in a Leading Role, Best Adapted Screenplay, Best Cinematography, Best Editing, and Best Film Music.

The film got six nominations at the 83rd Academy Awards, including Best Picture, Best Actor, Best Adapted Screenplay, Best Original Score, Best Original Song, and Best Film Editing.

It was also nominated for eight Broadcast Film Critics Association, including Best Film, Best Director, Best Actor, Best Adapted Screenplay, Best Cinematography, Best Editing, Best Song, and Best Sound. Its main theme song "If I Rise" won the Critics Choice award for Best Song.

James Franco was awarded Best Actor by the New York Film Critics Online and the Dallas–Fort Worth Film Critics Association.

See also
 Gerry (2002), a film directed by Gus Van Sant, inspired by the death of David Coughlin

References

External links

 
 
 

2010 films
2010 biographical drama films
2010 independent films
2010s English-language films
2010s survival films
American biographical drama films
American docudrama films
American independent films
American survival films
Biographical films about sportspeople
British biographical drama films
British docudrama films
British independent films
British survival films
Dune Entertainment films
Film4 Productions films
Films about amputees
Films based on autobiographies
Films directed by Danny Boyle
Films scored by A. R. Rahman
Films set in 2003
Films set in Utah
Films shot in Salt Lake City
Films with screenplays by Simon Beaufoy
Fox Searchlight Pictures films
HandMade Films films
Pathé films
Mountaineering films
Warner Bros. films
2010s American films
2010s British films
Films about disability